The Surrey Hills is a  Area of Outstanding Natural Beauty (AONB), which principally covers parts of the North Downs and Greensand Ridge in Surrey, England (approximately one quarter of the land area of the county). The AONB was designated in 1958 and adjoins the Kent Downs AONB to the east and the South Downs National Park in the south west.

Geography

It is part of the Greensand Ridge, which traverses the AONB from west to east, and is the second highest point in southeast England (Walbury Hill at 297 metres (974 ft) above sea level is the highest).

Blackheath Common is also part of this area.

The northern ridge of these hills, predominantly formed by chalk, is separated by the Vale of Holmesdale which continues into Kent from the southern ridges which are predominantly greensand. They provide a haven for rare plants and insects.  Parts of the area are owned and managed by the National Trust, including Ranmore Common, Leith Hill and Box Hill.

Other designations
Chiddingfold Forest, a Site of Special Scientific Interest (SSSI), lies within the area.

Surrey Hills AONB is surrounded by an Area of Great Landscape Value which covers a further 8% of the county.

Walking
The Surrey Hills area has three long-distance walks running through it: the North Downs Way, the Greensand Way and the Pilgrims' Way.

References

External links
Surrey Hills AONB
Inspiring Views Trail in the Surrey Hills

Hills of Surrey
Areas of Outstanding Natural Beauty in England
Protected areas of Surrey